The 2024 Indiana gubernatorial election will be held on November 5, 2024, to elect the next governor of Indiana, concurrently with the 2024 U.S. presidential election, as well as elections to the United States Senate and elections to the United States House of Representatives and various state and local elections. Incumbent Republican Governor Eric Holcomb is term-limited and cannot seek re-election to a third consecutive term in office.

Republican primary

Candidates

Declared
Mike Braun, U.S. Senator from Indiana (2019–present)
Suzanne Crouch, Lieutenant Governor of Indiana (2017–present) and former Indiana State Auditor (2014–2017)
Eric Doden, former president of the Indiana Economic Development Corporation

Publicly expressed interest

Potential
Brad Chambers, Indiana Secretary of Commerce (2021–present)
Jim Merritt, former state senator from the 31st district (1990–2020) and nominee for mayor of Indianapolis in 2019

Declined
Mitch Daniels, former governor (2005–2013), former President of Purdue University (2013–2022), and former Director of the Office of Management and Budget (2001–2003)

Polling

Democratic primary

Candidates

Formed exploratory committee
Jennifer McCormick, former Republican Indiana Superintendent of Public Instruction (2017–2021)

Publicly expressed interest
Christina Hale, former state representative, nominee for Lieutenant Governor in 2016, and nominee for Indiana's 5th congressional district in 2020
Thomas McDermott Jr., mayor of Hammond, nominee for U.S. Senate in 2022, and candidate for Indiana's 1st congressional district in 2020

Potential
Joe Donnelly, U.S. Ambassador to the Holy See and former U.S. Senator
Joe Hogsett, mayor of Indianapolis and former Indiana Secretary of State
Destiny Wells, deputy chair of the Indiana Democratic Party, former deputy attorney general, and nominee for Indiana Secretary of State in 2022

General election

Predictions

Notes

Partisan clients

References

External links
Mike Braun (R) for Governor
Suzanne Crouch (R) for Governor
Eric Doden (R) for Governor

2024
Governor
Indiana